The Huntsville Metropolitan Statistical Area is a metropolitan statistical area on the northern border of Alabama. The metro area's principal city is Huntsville, and consists of two counties: Limestone and Madison. As of the 2020 United States census, the Huntsville Metropolitan Area's population was 491,723, making it the 2nd-largest metropolitan area in Alabama (behind only the Birmingham metropolitan area) and the 117th-largest in the United States.

Places

Besides Huntsville, the following places are included in the metro area:
Ardmore
Athens
Brownsboro
East Limestone
Elkmont
Gurley
Harvest
Hazel Green
Madison
Meridianville
Monrovia
Moores Mill
New Hope
New Market
Owens Cross Roads
Redstone Arsenal (U.S. Army post)
Toney
Triana

Below is the population of the Huntsville metropolitan area since the first time it was recorded in the 1810 United States census; as of the 2020 United States census, the Huntsville metropolitan area had 491,723 people.

Transportation
 Interstate 65
 Interstate 565
 U.S. Highway 72
 U.S. Highway 231
 U.S. Highway 431

See also
Table of United States Metropolitan Statistical Areas
Table of United States Combined Statistical Areas
Alabama census statistical areas

References

 
Geography of Madison County, Alabama
Geography of Limestone County, Alabama
Geography of Huntsville, Alabama